

Fossils
 Englefield publishes a general work on the geology of the Isle of Wight, reporting the discovery of large, almost certainly dinosaurian bones being discovered by geologist Thomas Webster in what would later be identified as Cretaceous strata.

References

1810s in paleontology
Paleontology